Marialaura Simonetto (born 11 November 1987) is an Italian swimmer who competed in the 2008 Summer Olympics, but did not medal.

References

1987 births
Living people
Italian female swimmers
Italian female freestyle swimmers
Olympic swimmers of Italy
Swimmers at the 2008 Summer Olympics
European Aquatics Championships medalists in swimming
Universiade medalists in swimming
Universiade silver medalists for Italy